The Second Hundred Years may refer to:

 The Second Hundred Years (film), an American silent comedy short film starring Stan Laurel and Oliver Hardy prior to their official billing as the duo Laurel and Hardy
 The Second Hundred Years (TV series), a 1967 television series